The 1959 Australian Championships was a tennis tournament that took place on outdoor Grass courts at the Memorial Drive, Adelaide, Australia from 16 January to 26 January. It was the 47th edition of the Australian Championships (now known as the Australian Open), the 12th held in Adelaide, and the first Grand Slam tournament of the year.

Champions

Men's singles

 Alex Olmedo defeated  Neale Fraser  6–1, 6–2, 3–6, 6–3

Women's singles

 Mary Carter Reitano defeated  Renee Schuurman  6–2, 6–3

Men's doubles
 Rod Laver /  Robert Mark defeated  Don Candy /  Bob Howe 9–7, 6–4, 6–2

Women's doubles
 Sandra Reynolds /  Renée Schuurman defeated  Lorraine Coghlan /  Mary Reitano 7–5, 6–4

Mixed doubles
 Sandra Reynolds /  Bob Mark defeated  Renée Schuurman /  Rod Laver 4–6, 13–11, 6–1

References

External links
 Australian Open official website

Australian Championships
Australian Championships (tennis) by year
Australian Championships
Australian Championships